Need You may refer to:

 "Need You" (Sonny James song), 1967
 "Need You" (Travie McCoy song), 2010
 "Need U (100%)", a song by Duke Dumont, 2013
 "Need You", a song by Flight Facilities, 2018

See also
 I Need You (disambiguation)
 Need Me (disambiguation)